Dish Gadugi (also Romanized as Dīsh Gadūgī; also known as Dīsh Gadīg, Dīshgadākī, Dīsh Gadūkī, Dīsh Kadūgī, Dīsh Kand, and Dishkyand) is a village in Dizmar-e Sharqi Rural District, Minjavan District, Khoda Afarin County, East Azerbaijan Province, Iran. At the 2006 census, its population was 51, in 9 families.

References 

Populated places in Khoda Afarin County